Swan Creek is an unincorporated community in Warren County, Illinois, United States.

References

Unincorporated communities in Warren County, Illinois
Unincorporated communities in Illinois